Lodhi Bholana  is a village in Kapurthala district of Punjab State, India. The village is administrated by a Sarpanch who is an elected representative of village as per the constitution of India and Panchayati raj (India).

Demography 
According to the report published by Census India in 2011, Lodhi Bholana has 212 houses with the total population of 1,130 persons of which 594 are male and 536 females. Literacy rate of  Lodhi Bholana is 75.20%, lower than the state average of 75.84%.  The population of children in the age group 0–6 years is 154 which is 13.63% of the total population.  Child sex ratio is approximately 812, lower than the state average of 846.

Population data

References

External links
  Villages in Kapurthala
 Kapurthala Villages List

Villages in Kapurthala district